The North Central Conference (NCC), also known as North Central Intercollegiate Athletic Conference, was a college athletic conference which operated in the north central United States. It participated in the NCAA's Division II.

History
The NCC was formed in 1922.  Charter members of the NCC were South Dakota State College (now South Dakota State University), College of St. Thomas (now the University of St. Thomas), Des Moines University, Creighton University, North Dakota Agricultural College (now North Dakota State University), the University of North Dakota, Morningside College, the University of South Dakota, and Nebraska Wesleyan University.

The University of Northern Iowa was a member of the NCC from 1934 until 1978.  UNI currently competes in Division I in the Missouri Valley Conference; in FCS football, it competes in the Missouri Valley Football Conference. In 2002 Morningside College left the NCC to join the NAIA.  The University of Northern Colorado left the conference in 2003, followed in 2004 by North Dakota State University and South Dakota State University.  These three schools all transitioned their athletics programs from Division II to Division I; they became founding members of the Division I FCS Great West Football Conference, which started play in the fall of 2004.  Since that time, Northern Colorado moved on to the Big Sky Conference in all sports in 2006.  In the fall of 2006, North Dakota State and South Dakota State were admitted to The Summit League; they have also moved on to rejoin old conference mate Northern Iowa in the Missouri Valley Football Conference.

It was announced on November 29, 2006 that the 2007–08 athletic season would be the final season for the NCC and that the conference would cease operations on July 1, 2008.

The University of North Dakota and the University of South Dakota both announced in 2006 that they would reclassify its athletic programs to Division I, and both left the North Central Conference after the 2007-08 academic year. Both have since joined North Dakota State, South Dakota State, and Northern Iowa as members of the Missouri Valley Football Conference in football and the Summit League in all other sports.
Augustana College, the University of Minnesota Duluth, Minnesota State University, Mankato and St. Cloud State University were admitted to the Northern Sun Intercollegiate Conference beginning July 1, 2008.
The University of Nebraska at Omaha joined the Mid-America Intercollegiate Athletics Association starting July 1, 2008. UNO has since moved to Division I and is now in The Summit League with many of its former conference members.

Chronological timeline
 In 1922, the North Central Conference (also known as the North Central Intercollegiate Conference) was founded with nine charter members:  College of St. Thomas, Creighton University, Des Moines University, Morningside College, Nebraska Wesleyan University, North Dakota Agricultural College, University of North Dakota, South Dakota State College of Agricultural and Mechanical Arts, and the University of South Dakota.
 In 1926, Des Moines University left the NCC, which the school eventually would later close its doors in 1929.  Nebraska Wesleyan also left, joining the Nebraska Conference.  The North Central Conference was left with seven members.
 In 1928, Creighton University and the College of St. Thomas (now University of St. Thomas) left the NCC.  St. Thomas became a full member of the Minnesota Intercollegiate Athletic Conference while Creighton left to join the Missouri Valley Conference.  The NCC was left with five members.
 In 1934, Iowa State Teachers College joined the NCC from the Iowa Intercollegiate Athletic Conference.  Also, Omaha University joined the NCC to bring membership back up to seven schools.
 In 1942, Augustana College left the South Dakota Intercollegiate Conference to join the North Central Conference as its eighth member.
 In 1946, Omaha University left the NCC to join the Central Intercollegiate Conference.  The NCC is left with seven members.
 In 1960, North Dakota Agricultural College was renamed North Dakota State University
 In 1961, the Iowa State Teachers College was renamed the State College of Iowa
 In 1964, South Dakota State College was renamed South Dakota State University
 In 1967, State College of Iowa was renamed to the University of Northern Iowa
 In 1968, Mankato State College joins the NCC from the Northern Intercollegiate Conference, bringing league membership up to eight teams.
 In 1975, Mankato State College is renamed Mankato State University.
 In 1976, the University of Nebraska at Omaha (Omaha University was renamed to UNO in 1968) rejoined the NCC, while Mankato State University leaves the NCC due to not fielding a team in the 1976 season.  Membership in the NCC remains at eight schools.
 In 1978, the University of Northern Colorado left the Great Plains Athletic Conference and joined the North Central Conference.  In the same year, the University of Northern Iowa left the NCC to move to the Association of Mid-Continent Universities.  Membership remained at eight schools.
 In 1981, Mankato State University and St. Cloud State University joined the North Central Conference from the Northern Intercollegiate Conference, giving the NCC its largest membership total in history at 10 schools and it would remain at this level for the next 21 years.  Membership at this time included:  Augustana, Mankato State, Morningside, Nebraska-Omaha, North Dakota, North Dakota State, Northern Colorado, South Dakota, South Dakota State, and St. Cloud State.
 In 1998, Mankato State University is officially renamed to Minnesota State University, Mankato.
 In 2002, Morningside College, one of the North Central Conference's charter members, leaves the league and moves out of NCAA Division II to the NAIA level.  The NCC is left with nine members.
 In 2003, the University of Northern Colorado announces plans to move up to NCAA Division I and leaves the NCC with eight members.
 In 2004, charter members North Dakota State and South Dakota State also announce plans to move to Division I and leave the North Central Conference.  SDSU, NDSU and Northern Colorado founded the FCS Great West Football Conference.  The University of Minnesota-Duluth left the Northern Sun Intercollegiate Conference to join the NCC as its seventh member.
 In 2006, Central Washington University and Western Washington University of the Great Northwest Athletic Conference joined the North Central Conference as affiliate members in the sport of football only to give the conference nine football schools.
 In 2008, the two remaining charter members of the North Central Conference, the University of South Dakota and the University of North Dakota, announce plans to leave the conference and move up to Division I.  This move led to the rest of the league members making a move.  Central Washington and Western Washington joined up with other schools in the Pacific Northwest to form a football league in the GNAC.  Augustana, Minnesota-Duluth, Minnesota State and St. Cloud State remained in NCAA Division II by joining the Northern Sun Intercollegiate Conference.  Finally Nebraska-Omaha also remained in Division II by joining the Mid-America Intercollegiate Athletics Association (MIAA) before moving to Division I a year later.  These moves resulted in the dissolution of the North Central Conference after having existed for 86 years.

Member schools

Final members
The NCC had seven full members in the conference's final season, one was a private school:

Notes

Former members
The NCC had nine other full members during the conference's tenure, two were private schools:

Notes

Membership timeline

Sports
The NCC sponsored baseball, men's and women's basketball, football, cross-country, golf, soccer, softball, swimming & diving, tennis, track & field, volleyball, and wrestling.

Six of the seven members of the NCC sponsored Division I ice hockey, and five still do. In men's hockey, after a major conference realignment that took effect in 2013, Minnesota–Duluth, Nebraska–Omaha, North Dakota, and St. Cloud State field teams in the National Collegiate Hockey Conference, while Minnesota State–Mankato is a member of the Western Collegiate Hockey Association (WCHA). Before the realignment, all of these schools had been members of the WCHA for men's hockey. All of these schools, except for Omaha, have women's teams in the WCHA (Omaha women's hockey is a club sport). The women's side of the WCHA was not affected by this realignment.

Conference championships

Men's basketball
NCC Championships Per School

The NCC Tournament was held from 1991-1994, then it was brought back and used from 2001-2008.

NCC Regular Season Champions

NCC Tournament Champions

Women's basketball
NCC Championships Per School

NCC Regular Season Champions

NCC Tournament Champions

Football
NCC Championships Per School

NCC Champions By Year

Volleyball
NCC Championships Per School

NCC Champions By Year

Softball
NCC Championships Per School

NCC Champions By Year

Baseball
NCC Championships Per School

NCC Champions By Year

Women's soccer
NCC Championships Per School

NCC Regular Season Champions By Year

NCC Tournament Champions

Associate members
 Football - Western Washington University, Central Washington University
 Women's Swimming and Diving - Colorado Mines, Minnesota State University Moorhead, Metro State (CO)
 Men's Swimming and Diving - Colorado Mines, Metro State (CO)
 Men's Tennis - Winona State

Conference football stadiums

References

External links
 

 
1922 establishments in the United States
2008 disestablishments in the United States